Carlin at Carnegie is George Carlin's third special to be seen on HBO, recorded at Carnegie Hall, New York City in 1982, released in 1983. Most of the material comes from A Place for My Stuff, his ninth album released earlier that same year. Unlike the first two, this special was edited down to an hour and routines from the same show like "A Place for My Stuff" and "Baseball and Football" do not appear in this special. The performance of "Seven Dirty Words," his last recorded performance of the routine, features Carlin's updated list of inappropriate words.

Track listing
 Program opening
 Abortion
 Professional Comedian
 Heart Attack
 Rice Krispies
 Have a Nice Day
 Ice Box Man
 Fussy Eater 1 & 2
 New News
 The Musical Portion of the Show
 Dogs & Cats
 Filthy Words

See also
 On Location (TV series)

George Carlin
1980s American television specials
1980s in comedy
HBO network specials
Stand-up comedy concert films
1983 live albums
Carnegie Hall
1983 television specials